Cipriano Pérez y Arias (1784–1823) was a Costa Rican politician.

Personal information
He was baptized in Heredia, Costa Rica, on December 8, 1784. His parents were Matías Pérez Viera and Feliciana Arias and Ugalde. He married on April 30, 1804 Juana de Jesús Reyes and Bludgeons, daughter of Pablo José Reyes y Jiménez and Ramona Engracia Porras and González of León.

Career
The mayoralty of the town of Heredia designated him in October, 1821 as its representative in the Meeting of Legatees of the Mayoralties who met in Carthage on October 25 and October 26, 1821 to discuss the independence of Costa Rica from Spain. He was present on October 29, 1821 at the meeting of the Mayoralty of Carthage he signed the Record of Independence of Costa Rica.

Death
He died in Rivas, Nicaragua in February, 1823.

References

Costa Rican politicians
1784 births
1823 deaths